The bigmouth sculpin (Hemitripterus bolini) is a species of marine ray-finned fish belonging to the subfamily Hemitripterinae of the family Agonidae. This species is found in the northern Pacific Ocean from the Bering Sea and the Aleutian Islands south as far as Eureka, California.

References

Fish described in 1934
Bigmouth sculpin
Taxa named by George S. Myers